Katherine L. Knight is an American immunologist. She is professor and chair of the Department of Microbiology and Immunology at Loyola University Chicago whose research work has focused on the genetic basis of antibody formation and the interactions of the immune system with intestinal microbiota. Knight was president of The American Association of Immunologists from 1996 to 1997.

Education and training
Knight earned a Ph.D. from Indiana University followed by postdoctoral training at University of Illinois Chicago.

Awards
Knight was awarded the American Association for Immunology (AAI) Lifetime Achievement Award in 2013, The Marion Spencer Fay Award from the Institute for Women's Health and Leadership at the Drexel University College of Medicine in 2015, and was elected a Distinguished Fellow of AAI in 2019.

In February 2010, Knight was recognised as the Scientist of the Month by the Chicago branch of the Association for Women in Science.

References 

Year of birth missing (living people)
Living people
American immunologists
Women immunologists
20th-century American scientists
20th-century American women scientists
21st-century American scientists
21st-century American women scientists
Indiana University alumni
University of Illinois Chicago alumni
Loyola University Chicago faculty